Mark Dynamix (born Mark Kenneth Vick on 19 May 1975) is an Australian DJ, producer, mixer, radio presenter and record label owner/manager. He ran the Australian operations of Ministry of Sound Recordings for Sony Music Australia from 2017-2019. He began working as a DJ in 1990, aged 14. He has published 40+ mix CDs alongside an extensive catalogue of original music releases.

Dynamix has "sold more CDs than any other Australian DJ" with more than 40 releases by February 2019. His 2006 release Ministry of Sound: The 2006 Annual mix CD was Australia's highest-selling compilation. He was the first Australian to DJ at the MTV Australian Video Music Awards.

His Ministry of Sound release Sessions Two reached fourth on the overall album charts but first on both compilation and dance music album charts. inthemix.com.au members voted Dynamix the number two DJ in Australia for two consecutive years, and he was voted number one by 3D World in 2002. 

In 2006, he released his first original single, "Identify Me", featuring Jaytech, which was also included on his Mixtape CD, which he put together for Ministry of Sound. On this CD set, "Identify Me" was layered together with another track and was also included as an extra CD single including a set of remixes. His second single, "Destructor" (also featuring Jaytech), was also featured on the Mixtape CD. Other singles include 2010's "I Gotcha" (featuring Nick Galea), 2016's "Identify Me 2017", and 2018's "Salt 2.0", featuring Namito and JimiJ. He has also released a dozen official remixes between 2004 and 2020. His EPs from 2019-2021 have included "What U Do To Me (remixed)" & "Amplification/Destructor EP". He has released an album Archival: Opening The Vaults which reached Number 4 on iTunes Dance Albums Australia, and Archival: Remixed which reached number 1 on the iTunes Dance Chart in Australia, Netherlands and Top 10 across Europe and parts of Asia. The album reached number 21 on the Netherland Pop/Rock charts and number 35 on the Australian Pop/Rock charts. 

From 2007, Dynamix lived and worked in Berlin before returning to Australia. From 2008, he used the name MDX, as he was "starting a clean slate with new ideas and musical output, but reverted back to using the name MARK DYNAMIX around 2013." He established a record label, Long Distance Recordings which houses artists such as Namito, Deepchild, Danny Bonnici, Jaytech, Nick Galea, Mortlock. His new venture on the label with Danny Muller called THE ANTIPODEANS recently had success with their reworking of the ICEHOUSE classic "Hey Little Girl" with track reaching number 2 on the iTunes Electronic Albums chart in Australia (the single was classed as an EP meaning it entered the album chart). The song was remixed using the master stems with full permission from Iva Davies and is an authorised release.  

In May 2019, he relocated from Sydney to Melbourne. In February 2021, due to the continuing COVID-19 lockdowns in Melbourne, he relocated from Melbourne to Brisbane.

References

External Links
 Biography on The DJ List

Australian DJs
Living people
1975 births